Turjanski Vrh is a settlement in the hills above Mota in the Municipality of Radenci in northeastern Slovenia.

References

External links
Turjanski Vrh on Geopedia

Populated places in the Municipality of Radenci